The 1924 Buffalo Bisons season was their fifth in the league. The team failed to improve on their previous output of 5–4–3, losing five games. They finished ninth in the league.

Schedule

Standings

References

Buffalo Bisons (NFL) seasons
Buffalo Bisons
Buffalo Bisons NFL